Dublin Intermediate Hurling Championship is an annual Gaelic Athletic Association club competition between the Intermediate Dublin Clubs. The finalists of this Championship qualify for the Dublin Senior Hurling B Championship the following season. The winners of this competition play-off against the Senior B winners to determine which club represents Dublin in the Leinster Intermediate Club Hurling Championship

In the 2020 final Naomh Mearnóg held on for victory against Fingallians (1-11 to 1-10) to secure the honours in Parnell Park.

Roll of Honour

References

External links
Official Dublin Website
Dublin on Hoganstand
Dublin Club GAA
Reservoir Dubs

 3
Intermediate hurling county championships